NGC 3079 is a barred spiral galaxy about 50 million light-years away, and located in the constellation Ursa Major. A prominent feature of this galaxy is the "bubble" forming in the very center (see picture below).

Center Bubble
The bubble forming in the center of NGC 3079 is believed to be about 3000 light-years wide and to rise more than 3500 light-years above the disc of the galaxy.  It is speculated that the bubble is being formed by particles streaming at high speeds, which were in turn caused by a large burst of star formation.  This current bubble is thought to have been created about one million years ago, and computer modeling suggests that there is an ongoing cycle of forming bubbles, with a new bubble forming approximately every 10 million years.

See also
 Sombrero Galaxy

References

External links

 HST: Burst of Star Formation Drives Bubble in Galaxy's Core
 Superwind Sculpts Filamentary Features - Chandra X-ray Observatory
 

Barred spiral galaxies
Ursa Major (constellation)
3079
05387
29050